Amli is the Gujarati term for tamarind and may also refer to:

Amli, India, a town in the Union Territory of Dadra & Nagar Haveli
Åmli, a town in Norway
Amli, a play by Hrishikesh Sulabh in Bideshiya Shaili
AMLI Residential, a real estate company in the US